Jörg Ratgeb – Painter is a 1978 East German drama film directed by Bernhard Stephan. It was entered into the 28th Berlin International Film Festival.

Cast
 Alois Švehlík - Jörg Ratgeb
 Margrit Tenner - Barbara
 Olgierd Łukaszewicz - Bischof
 Günter Naumann - Joß Fritz
 Małgorzata Braunek - Junge Bäurin
 Henry Hübchen - Thomas Niedler
 Rolf Hoppe - Gaukler
 Marylu Poolman - Seine Frau
 Martin Trettau - Albrecht Dürer
 Helga Göring - Agnes Dürer
 Hilmar Baumann - Vogt
 Thomas Neumann - Christoph Enderlin
 Monika Hildebrand - Frau Ratgeb
 Giso Weißbach - Kommandeur
 Günter Rüger - Fiedler
 Peter Pauli - Dudelsackpfeiffer
 Erich Petraschk - Alter Bauer
 Bodo Krämer - Landsknecht

See also
Jerg Ratgeb

References

External links

1978 films
1970s biographical films
German biographical films
East German films
1970s German-language films
Films directed by Bernhard Stephan
Films set in the 16th century
Films set in the Holy Roman Empire
Biographical films about painters
1970s German films